Sumo Suit Athletics is an international sport which started in the United Kingdom in the year 2008. It is a sport where participants wear sumo fat suits while doing regular athletic events.
The suits used weigh around 11 kg. The suits restrict leg movement, and participants are not allowed to use their hands to lift the suits up. This results in participants raising their arms and shoulders while running producing a comedic effect.

World championships
There have now been three World Championship events held since 2008 with the next event set to take place some time in 2012.

The five main events at the World Championships include:
100m sprint, Long jump, High jump, Shot put and the 400m endurance race. 

The 2009 men's event, held at the Battersea athletics track in London, was dominated by three South Africans, Willem Muller, Jeremy Gallop and brother Michael Gallop,  who won in all 5 events.  Four world records were broken with only the 100m record standing from the previous year. In the women's event Charlotte Willis from Great Britton won 3 events, and four new world records were set in part due to the introduction of 'child's' suits for the women instead of adult suits. The women's High Jump record from 2008 was not beaten.

The 2010 event was again held at the Battersea athletics track in London. In the men's event all but the Shot Put world record was broken. Ed Moyse set a new 100m record with 14.43secs and also a Long Jump record of 4.25m. Jeremy Gallop bettered his own record from 2009 in the High Jump by jumping 1.31m. Sam Hyatt-Twynam ran a blistering pace in the 400m to set a new world record of 1.26secs.
In the women's event Jo Higgins dominated by setting four new world records in the 100m, Long Jump, Shot Put and 400m. Gabrielle Morales from Hungary set a new women's high jump record with a height of 1.05m.

Records
The current world records (as of June 2010) are:

Men's World Records

Women's World Records

Men's Seasons Best
(Updated August 2010)

100m Sprint

High Jump

Long Jump

Shot Put
(Updated August 2010)

400m "Endurance"

Women's Seasons Best
 (Updated August 2010)

100m Sprint

High Jump

Long Jump

Shot Put
(Updated August 2010)

400m "Endurance"

Record Sources:

References

External links 

 www.sumosuitathletics.co.uk

Individual sports
Athletics by type